The Clamshell Falls is a cascade waterfall on the Behana Creek, located in Wooroonooran, Cairns Region, Queensland, Australia.

Location and features
The falls are situated in the Wooroonooran National Park and descend down to the Behana Gorge, below the Whites Falls.

See also

 List of waterfalls of Queensland

References

  

Waterfalls of Far North Queensland
Cascade waterfalls